Allure may refer to:
 Interpersonal attraction
 Seduction, or persuasion to engage in a behavior, often romantic

Film
Allure (2014 film), an American film by Vladan Nikolic
Allure (2017 film), a Canadian film by Carlos and Jason Sanchez
Allures (film), a 1961 American short by Jordan Belson

Music
Allure (band), an American R&B group
Allure (album), by Allure, 1997
Allure (EP), by Hyomin, 2019
Tiësto, Dutch DJ and producer who has also recorded as Allure
"Allures", a 2000–2001 composition by François Bayle
"Allure", a song by Jay-Z from The Black Album

Other uses
Alure, or allure, a passage behind the parapet of a church
Allure (fortification), or chemin de ronde, a raised protected walkway behind a castle battlement
Allure (magazine), an American women's magazine
Allure Las Vegas, a condominium project in Las Vegas, Nevada, US
Buick Allure, the Canadian-market name for the Buick LaCrosse
MS Allure of the Seas, a cruise ship owned by Royal Caribbean International

See also
Allura (disambiguation)
Allured (disambiguation)
Alured (disambiguation)